Eleutherodactylus poolei is a species of frog in the family Eleutherodactylidae. It is endemic to Nord, Haiti, where it is only known from the Citadelle Laferrière, and possibly from nearby Carrefour Marmelade.
It was found in a moist dungeon of the Citadelle Laferrière and was last recorded in 1985. It probably occurs in the surrounding forest. Habitat loss caused by logging and agriculture is threat to this species. The fort itself is a World Heritage Site.

References

poolei
Frogs of Haiti
Endemic fauna of Haiti
Amphibians described in 1938
Taxa named by Doris Mable Cochran
Taxonomy articles created by Polbot